Bridget Kathleen Archer (born 18 May 1975) is an Australian politician who has been a member of the House of Representatives since the 2019 federal election. She is a member of the Liberal Party and represents the Division of Bass in Tasmania.

Early life
Archer was born in Hobart, Tasmania. Her father died when she was eight years old, after which her family moved to Ravenswood, a suburb of Launceston. Archer attended Ravenswood Primary School and Launceston Church Grammar School before moving back to Hobart to attend the University of Tasmania, although she soon dropped out. She worked at the Tasmanian Herbarium from 1995 to 1999, as a botanical curator. She later worked in "a variety of mostly casual administrative and hospitality jobs", including at the 2000 Summer Olympics, before returning to university. She completed a Bachelor of Arts in English and political science, followed by a graduate certificate in international politics.

Local government
Archer was elected to the George Town Council in 2009. She served as deputy mayor from 2011 to 2014 and then as mayor until resigning in 2019 to enter federal politics.

State and federal politics
Archer served as secretary and treasurer of the Liberal Party's George Town branch from 2012 to 2013. She stood unsuccessfully in Bass at the 2018 state election, as one of five candidates on the party's ticket.

In November 2018, Archer announced that she would run for Liberal preselection in Bass. She was elected to parliament at the 2019 federal election, defeating the incumbent Australian Labor Party (ALP) candidate Ross Hart.

Archer is a member of the moderate faction of the Liberal Party.

In December 2020, Archer publicly criticised the Morrison Government's trial of a cashless debit card to deliver welfare payments, stating that she would oppose its use within her own electorate and describing it as a "punitive measure enacted on the presumption that all welfare recipients within the trial areas are incapable of managing their finances and require the government's assistance". The House of Representatives passed legislation to make the card permanent by one vote, with Archer abstaining from voting despite her earlier criticism.

Archer has crossed the floor several times:
 25 November 2021, to support a motion by Helen Haines that called for a debate on a national anti-corruption commission.
10 February 2022, with four other Liberal MPs, to include protection for transgender students in the government's modifications to the Sex Discrimination Act.
4 August 2022, the sole member of the Liberal/National coalition to cross the floor to vote in favour of the government's 43% carbon emissions reduction target legislation.
30 November 2022, the sole member of the Liberal/National coalition to cross the floor to vote in favour of the government's motion to censure former prime minister Scott Morrison over his secret appointment to several other ministries;  she said that she was registering support, as a Liberal, for the rule of law.

Personal life
Archer has five children with her husband Winston. After marrying they moved to his family property outside George Town, where they farm sheep and beef cattle.

References

1975 births
Living people
Members of the Australian House of Representatives
Members of the Australian House of Representatives for Bass
Liberal Party of Australia members of the Parliament of Australia
Women members of the Australian House of Representatives
Mayors of places in Tasmania
University of Tasmania alumni
21st-century Australian politicians
Women mayors of places in Tasmania
Politicians from Hobart
Tasmanian local councillors
21st-century Australian women politicians